Let's Knife is a studio album by Shonen Knife. It was originally released on August 26, 1992 in Japan. The album features re-recorded versions of earlier Shonen Knife songs, with new English lyrics. It peaked at number 64 on the Oricon Albums Chart. In 2007, Rolling Stone Japan placed it at number 37 on its list of the "100 Greatest Japanese Rock Albums of All Time".

Track listing

Personnel
Credits adapted from the liner notes.

 Naoko Yamano – vocals, guitar
 Michie Nakatani – vocals, bass guitar
 Atsuko Yamano – vocals, drums, percussion, keyboards

Charts

References

External links
 

1992 albums
Shonen Knife albums
MCA Records albums
Virgin Records albums
Creation Records albums